Rock Camp is a 13-episode Canadian reality television series that aired on CBC in 2004. Episodes featured 18 youths training to become rock musicians, as filmed in Halifax, Nova Scotia. The series was first broadcast 5 April 2004.

External links

Rock Camp official website
 
 
 

CBC Television original programming
2000s Canadian documentary television series
2000s Canadian reality television series
2004 Canadian television series debuts
2004 Canadian television series endings
Television shows filmed in Halifax, Nova Scotia